Flamenco is a barrio in the island-municipality of Culebra, Puerto Rico. Its population in 2010 was 1,048.

Sectors
Barrios (which are roughly comparable to minor civil divisions) in turn are further subdivided into smaller local populated place areas/units called sectores (sectors in English). The types of sectores may vary, from normally sector to urbanización to reparto to barriada to residencial, among others.

The following sectors are in Flamenco barrio:

Gallery

See also

 List of communities in Puerto Rico
 List of barrios and sectors of Culebra, Puerto Rico

References

External links

Barrios of Culebra, Puerto Rico